T2ya, born , is a Japanese songwriter and keyboardist from Gunma Prefecture. In the 1990s, he supported the agency Rising Production, which was later renamed Vision Factory. He wrote both the music and the lyrics of Olivia Lufkin's "I.L.Y. (Yokubō)" and "Re-act." He also composed Mika Nakashima's "One Survive."

In addition, T2ya wrote Aya Ueto's "Pureness," "Kizuna," "Hello" and "Personal."

References

External links
T2ya at MobyGames

1982 births
Japanese composers
Japanese keyboardists
Japanese male composers
Living people
Musicians from Gunma Prefecture
People from Gunma Prefecture